Michael Zager (born January 3, 1943) is an American record producer, composer, and arranger of original music for commercials, albums, network television, and theme music for films. He teaches music at Florida Atlantic University. Zager was a member of jazz rock band Ten Wheel Drive from 1968 to 1973.

Music career
Zager has produced for artists such as Whitney Houston, Cissy Houston, Peabo Bryson, Luther Vandross, Deniece Williams, Jennifer Holliday, Joe Williams, Arturo Sandoval, Herb Alpert, Olatunji, and The Spinners. Zager produced R&B artist Street Corner Symphony (1975), Marilyn Chambers (1976), Andrea True (1977), Dee Edwards (1980), Take Five (1981), Elusion (1981). He also co-wrote the Patti Day song "Right Before My Eyes" with Alexander Forbes.

In 1978, the Michael Zager Band had a popular disco anthem with "Let's All Chant". During 1979 and 1980 Zager wrote the medley arrangements for the Spinners' "Working My Way Back to You" / "Forgive Me, Girl" (No. 2 US Billboard Hot 100 in March–April 1980, No. 1 UK) and "Cupid" / "I've Loved You for a Long Time" (No. 4 US Hot 100 in July–August 1980, No. 4 UK).

Appointments
Zager graduated from University of Miami and the Mannes College of Music. He taught at the Mannes College of Music, a division within The New School, in New York City.

During the summers of 2006 and 2008 Zager taught at the College of Music at Payap University in Chiang Mai, Thailand.

He holds the positions of the Dorothy F. Schmidt Eminent Scholar in Performing Arts and professor of music at Florida Atlantic University in Boca Raton, Florida.

He is the author of Writing Music for Television and Radio Commercials (A Manual for Composers and Students) published by Scarecrow Press, and Music Production: For Producers, Composers, Arrangers, and Students, also published by Scarecrow Press.

Discography

Studio albums

Singles

See also
List of Billboard number-one dance club songs
List of artists who reached number one on the U.S. Dance Club Songs chart

References

External links
 
 Official website

1943 births
Living people
American dance musicians
American disco musicians
Columbia Records artists
Record producers from New Jersey
Songwriters from New Jersey
Musicians from Passaic, New Jersey
Private Stock Records artists
The New School faculty
Mannes School of Music alumni
University of Miami alumni